Horace White (October 7, 1865 – November 27, 1943) was an American lawyer and politician from New York. He was the 37th Governor of New York from October 6, 1910 to December 31, 1910.

Life
He attended Syracuse Central High School, Cornell University (graduated 1887), and Columbia Law School (graduated 1889), and opened the firm of White, Cheney, Shinaman, and O'Neill in Syracuse, New York in the late 1880s or early 1890s. While at Cornell he was a member of The Kappa Alpha Society.

He was a member of the New York State Senate (36th D.) from 1896 to 1907, sitting in the 119th, 120th, 121st, 122nd, 123rd, 124th, 125th, 126th, 127th, 128th, 129th, 130th and 131st New York State Legislatures; and participated in the drawing of the consolidation charter of the City of New York.

He was Lieutenant Governor of New York from 1909 to 1910, elected at the New York state election, 1908 on the Republican ticket with Governor Charles Evans Hughes. Hughes resigned in October 1910 when he was appointed to the United States Supreme Court, and White succeeded to the governorship, remaining in office until the end of the year.

White served as a trustee of Cornell University from 1916 to 1943. White, who was the nephew of Cornell's first President, Andrew Dickson White, left three-quarters of his estate to the University, and that fund had grown to $1.5 million by 1973. In White's honor, in 1973, Cornell named two professorships after him: the first two Cornell faculty to become Horace White Professors were Michael Fisher and Jack Kiefer.  He was also active in Syracuse, serving as president of the Post-Standard Company and participating in numerous other civil, social, and business organizations.

White once owned Fox Island in the east of Lake Ontario, located in the Town of Cape Vincent.

White was the last governor to come from Western New York until Kathy Hochul became Governor after the resignation of Andrew Cuomo in 2021.

He was buried at Oakwood Rural Cemetery in Syracuse, New York.

References

External links
 Horace White Papers at Syracuse University

Horace White at National Governors Association
Horace White at New York State Hall of Governors

1865 births
1943 deaths
American Episcopalians
Columbia Law School alumni
Cornell University alumni
Republican Party governors of New York (state)
Lieutenant Governors of New York (state)
Republican Party New York (state) state senators
Politicians from Buffalo, New York
Burials at Oakwood Cemetery (Syracuse, New York)
Lawyers from Buffalo, New York